Treschow is a Norwegian family descended from Just Hermansen Treschow, a merchant in Moss. This family is not known to be related to a different Treschow family in Norway. Its most famous member was philosopher and politician Niels Treschow (1751–1833), the grandson of Just Hermansen Treschow and son of merchant Peter Treschow (1718–73).

References

Norwegian families